Coptobasoides leopoldi is a moth in the family Crambidae. It was described by Anthonie Johannes Theodorus Janse in 1935. It is found on Sulawesi in Indonesia.

References

Moths described in 1935
Pyraustinae